Goldthwaite Independent School District is a public school district based in Goldthwaite, Texas, United States.

In 2009, the school district was rated "academically acceptable" by the Texas Education Agency.

On July 1, 2014 Star Independent School District consolidated into Goldthwaite ISD.

Schools
Goldthwaite High School (Grades 9–12)
Goldthwaite Middle School (Grades 6–8)
Goldthwaite Elementary School (Grades PK–5)

References

External links
Goldthwaite ISD

School districts in Mills County, Texas
School districts in Hamilton County, Texas
School districts in Lampasas County, Texas